Clube Desportivo da Lunda Sul is an Angolan football club based in Saurimo. They are making their debut in Girabola – the Angolan First Division – in the 2021–22 season, after being promoted from the Gira Angola.

The club plays their home matches at Saurimo's Mangueiras stadium

League and cup positions

Players and staff

Staff

Manager history

Players

See also
 Girabola
 Gira Angola

References

External links
Girabola Profile
Facebook Profile
zerozero.pt profile
rna
desporto

Football clubs in Angola
Sports clubs in Angola